Southwestern Bell Internet Services, Inc. was one of the companies owned by AT&T that provided AT&T Yahoo!-branded Internet services to customers located within Arkansas, Kansas, Missouri, Oklahoma, and Texas. 

It now does business as AT&T Internet Services.

References

External links
AT&T Yahoo! homepage

AT&T subsidiaries
Telecommunications companies established in 1996
Internet service providers of the United States